Jjinppang is a steamed bun, typically filled with red bean paste with bits of broken beans and bean husk. Traditional jjinppang is made of sourdough fermented using the yeast in makgeolli (rice wine), but younger varieties such as hoppang are often made without fermentation. Warm jjinppang is softer than baked breads due to the higher moisture content, but it hardens as it cools. Thus it is recommended to eat while the bun is still hot. Hardened jjinppang can be steamed again before eaten.

Jjinppang is a specialty product of Anheung Township in Hoengseong County, Gangwon Province. In the township, there is Anheung Jjinppang Village where 17 steameries that make Anheung-jjinppang. Since 1999, the township also hosts Anheung Jjinppang Festival in every October.

Varieties 
 Anheung-jjinppang – a variety of jjinppang made in traditional way, using sourdough fermented with the yeast from makgeolli; a specialty of Anheung.
 gamgyul-jjinppang – mandarin orange jjinppang, made and sold in Jeju Island. The orange-colored dough is made with mandarin orange.
 hoppang – a variety of jjinppang filled with sweeter and smoother red bean paste, passed through a sieve to remove bean skins.

Gallery

See also 
 Begodya
 Bungeo-ppang
 Hotteok
 List of buns
 List of steamed foods
 List of stuffed dishes

References

External links 

 

Korean breads
Korean snack food
Steamed buns
Street food in South Korea
Stuffed dishes
Foods with alcoholic drinks